Agung Mannan (born 6 August 1998) is an Indonesian professional footballer who plays as a centre back for Liga 1 club PSM Makassar.

Club career

PSM Makassar
He was signed for PSM Makassar to play in Liga 1 in the 2022 season. Mannan made his league debut on 23 July 2022 in a match against PSS Sleman at the Maguwoharjo Stadium, Sleman.

Career statistics

Club

Notes

References

External links
 Agung Mannan at Soccerway
 Agung Mannan at Liga Indonesia

1998 births
Living people
Indonesian footballers
Sportspeople from South Sulawesi
Liga 2 (Indonesia) players
Liga 1 (Indonesia) players
Dewa United F.C. players
Persinga Ngawi players
Persijap Jepara players
PSM Makassar players
Association football defenders